Broomisaurus is an extinct genus of Gorgonopsia. It was first named by Joleaud in 1920, and contains the single species B. planiceps. Gebauer (2007) considered Broomisaurus to be a nomen dubium, indistinguishable as a separate taxon of gorgonopsian because it is based on only a fragmentary remains. A 2015 paper on Eriphostoma tentatively agreed with Gebauer's determination, but did not rule out the possibility that Broomisaurus might be synonymous with Eriphostoma.

References

Sources
Palaeontologia Africana; page 106. By the Bernard Price Institute for Paleontological Research, published 1953.
www.paleofile.com - Alphabetical list, B section

Gorgonopsia
Prehistoric therapsid genera
Fossil taxa described in 1920